The 2001 South American Rugby Championship was the 23rd edition of the competition of the leading national Rugby Union teams in South America.

The tournament wasn' played in an host country.

Argentina (that played with the "Development XV") won the tournament.

Preliminary

Standings 
 Three point for victory, two for draw, and one for lost 
{| class="wikitable"
|-
!width=165|Team
!width=40|Played
!width=40|Won
!width=40|Drawn
!width=40|Lost
!width=40|For
!width=40|Against
!width=40|Difference
!width=40|Pts
|- bgcolor=#ccffcc align=center
|align=left| 
|3||3||0||0||174||45||+ 129||9
|- align=center
|align=left| 
|3||2||0||1||95||78||+ 17||7
|- align=center
|align=left| 
|3||1||0||2||78||68||+ 10||5
|- align=center
|align=left| 
|3||0||0||3||23||179||- 156||3
|}

Results

References

2001
2001 rugby union tournaments for national teams
A
2001 in Argentine rugby union
rugby union
rugby union
rugby union
rugby union
International rugby union competitions hosted by Uruguay
International rugby union competitions hosted by Argentina
International rugby union competitions hosted by Chile
International rugby union competitions hosted by Paraguay